Cerithiopsis petanii is a species of sea snail, a gastropod in the family Cerithiopsidae.

It was described by J. Prkic and P. Mariottini in 2010, and is known from Croatia.

References

petanii
Gastropods described in 2010